Phetphutai Sitsarawatseua (เพชรภูไท ศิษย์สารวัตรเสือ) is a Thai Muay Thai fighter. He currently trains out of Sitsarawatseua gym in Samut Prakan alongside Kompetch Sitsarawatseua, Wanchainoi Sitsarawatseua, and Kongsuk Sitsarawatseua.

Biography 
Phetphuthai's parents are ethnic Phu Thai from Nakhon Phanom, though Phetphutai himself was born and raised in the Bang Na District of Bangkok.

He started boxing in kindergarten, inspired by his father who was a former boxer, and who would be Phetphuthai's first trainer. As life was very tough for his family, he would help his parents sell grilled squid everyday after practice.

His first fight was when he was still in kindergarten, Phetphuthai was knocked out. At 13 years old, while still under his father's guidance, he won his first fight at the famed Rajadamnern Stadium by decision (84 lbs).

In 2016, when he was 14 years old, Petphuthai was contacted by Sia Phairot Punpho of the champion-factory, Sitsarawatseua gym, and he has been training there under Kru Gai ever since. In that same year, he had his tonsils removed due to the breathing difficulties they caused. This would stop him from eating normally for a month, which in turn made his return-to-form very long.

At only 18 years old, Phetphuthai has already won the Lumpinee Stadium, Channel 7 Stadium, and Thailand titles in three different weight classes.

Titles and accomplishments 

Muay Thai

 Professional Boxing Association of Thailand (PAT)
 2020 Thailand 126 lbs Champion
 Channel 7 Stadium
 2019 Channel 7 Stadium 122 lbs Champion
 Lumpinee Stadium
 2017 Lumpinee Stadium 108 lbs Champion

Fight record

|-  style="background:#cfc;"
| 2023-02-18 || Win ||align=left| Sakulchailek Pangkongpap || RWS VickRajadamnern, Rajadamnern Stadium|| Bangkok, Thailand || KO|| 4 ||  

|-  style="background:#cfc;"
| 2022-12-19 || Win ||align=left| Rungsaengtawan Sor.Parat || Nakhon Phanom Super Fight + Chang Muay Thai Kiatpetch || Nakhon Phanom province, Thailand || Decision || 5 || 3:00 

|- style="background:#fbb;"
|2021-02-28
|Loss
| align="left" | Lamnamoonlek Tded99
|Channel 7 Stadium
|Bangkok, Thailand
|Decision (majority)
|5
|3:00
|- style="background:#cfc;"
|2020-09-20
|Win
| align="left" | Phetrung Sitnayokkaipradiew
|Or.Tor.Gor.3 Stadium
|Nonthaburi, Thailand
|KO (right elbow)
|3
|
|-
! colspan="9" style="background:white" |
|- style="background:#cfc;"
|2020-08-23
|Win
| align="left" | Messi Pangkongprab
|Or.Tor.Gor.3 Stadium
|Nonthaburi, Thailand
|KO (right elbow)
|4
|
|- style="text-align:center; background:#cfc;"
|2020-03-06
|Win
| align="left" | Worawut MU.Den
|Lumpinee Stadium
|Bangkok, Thailand
|KO (left elbow)
|3
|
|- style="text-align:center; background:#cfc;"
|2020-02-04
|Win
| align="left" | Dieselnoi Sor.Damnern
|Lumpinee Stadium
|Bangkok, Thailand
|Decision
|5
|3:00
|- style="background:#cfc;"
|2019-12-06
|Win
| align="left" | Phetrung Sitnayokkaipradiew
|Lumpinee Stadium
|Bangkok, Thailand
|Decision
|5
|3:00
|- style="background:#fbb;"
|2019-09-26
|Loss
| align="left" | Khunsuknoi SItkaewprapon
|Rajadamnern Stadium
|Bangkok, Thailand
|Decision
|5
|3:00
|- style="background:#fbb;"
|2019-08-04
|Loss
| align="left" | Dieselnoi Sor.Damnern
|Or.Tor.Gor.3 Stadium
|Nonthaburi, Thailand
|Decision
|5
|3:00
|- style="background:#cfc;"
|2019-03-23
|Win
| align="left" | Phet Sawansangmancha
|Channel 7 Stadium
|Bangkok, Thailand
|Decision
|5
|3:00
|-
! colspan="9" style="background:white" |
|- style="background:#cfc;"
|2019-02-17
|Win
| align="left" | Kongsak Sor.Satta
|Lumpinee Stadium
|Bangkok, Thailand
|Decision
|5
|3:00
|- style="background:#cfc;"
|2018-12-07
|Win
| align="left" | Saifon Ratanaphu
|Lumpinee Stadium
|Bangkok, Thailand
|Decision
|5
|3:00
|- style="background:#fbb;"
|2018-11-09
|Loss
| align="left" | Pompetch Sitnumnoi
|Lumpinee Stadium
|Bangkok, Thailand
|Decision
|5
|3:00
|- style="background:#cfc;"
|2018-10-02
|Win
| align="left" | Peemai Erawan
|Lumpinee Stadium
|Bangkok, Thailand
|Decision
|5
|3:00
|- style="background:#c5d2ea;"
|2018-09-04
|Draw
| align="left" | Rungnarai Kiatmuu9
|Lumpinee Stadium
|Bangkok, Thailand
|Decision
|5
|3:00
|- style="background:#cfc;"
|2018-08-07
|Win
| align="left" | Phetpailin Sitnumnoi
|Lumpinee Stadium
|Bangkok, Thailand
|Decision
|5
|3:00
|- style="background:#cfc;"
|2018-06-05
|Win
| align="left" | Patakphet Sinbeemuaythai
|Lumpinee Stadium
|Bangkok, Thailand
|Decision
|5
|3:00
|- style="background:#cfc;"
|2018-02-06
|Win
| align="left" | Nengern P.K.Saenchaimuaythaigym
|Rajadamnern Stadium
|Bangkok, Thailand
|Decision
|5
|3:00
|- style="background:#fbb;"
|2017-12-26
|Loss
| align="left" | Peemai Erawan
|Lumpinee Stadium
|Bangkok, Thailand
|Decision
|5
|3:00
|- style="background:#cfc;"
|2017-11-07
|Win
| align="left" | Phettareua Cedakobwatsaduphan
|Lumpinee Stadium
|Bangkok, Thailand
|Decision
|5
|3:00
|-
! colspan="9" style="background:white" |
|- style="background:#cfc;"
|2017-09-05
|Win
| align="left" | Saknarin Pangkongprab
|Lumpinee Stadium
|Bangkok, Thailand
|Decision
|5
|3:00
|- style="background:#cfc;"
|2017-08-04
|Win
| align="left" | Branthai Kelasport
|Lumpinee Stadium
|Bangkok, Thailand
|Decision
|5
|3:00

|- style="background:#cfc;"
|2017-07-04
|Win
| align="left" | Thai Parunchai
|Lumpinee Stadium
|Bangkok, Thailand
|Decision
|5
|3:00
|- style="background:#cfc;"
|2017-03-28
|Win
| align="left" | Saenchainoi Thanaimichel
|Lumpinee Stadium
|Bangkok, Thailand
|Decision
|5
|3:00
|- style="background:#cfc;"
|2017-01-21
|Win
| align="left" | Pataktong Sinbeemuaythai
|Lumpinee Stadium
|Bangkok, Thailand
|Decision
|5
|3:00
|- style="background:#cfc;"
|2016-10-01
|Win
| align="left" | Yodchai YOKKAOSaenchaigym
|Lumpinee Stadium
|Bangkok, Thailand
|Decision
|5
|3:00
|- style="background:#cfc;"
|2016-08-20
|Win
| align="left" | Somjitlek Sor.Charoenpaet
|Lumpinee Stadium
|Bangkok, Thailand
|Decision
|5
|3:00
|- style="background:#cfc;"
|2016-07-06
|Win
| align="left" | Phadetsuk Sor.Sakcharoen
|Lumpinee Stadium
|Bangkok, Thailand
|Decision
|5
|3:00
|- style="background:#cfc;"
|2015-12-28
|Win
| align="left" | Chalongchai Sitnayoksamran
|Rajadamnern Stadium
|Bangkok, Thailand
|Decision
|5
|3:00
|-
| colspan=9 | Legend:

References 

Phetphuthai Sitsarawatseua
Living people
2002 births
Phetphuthai Sitsarawatseua